Contessa is a 2018 Indian Malayalam drama film, written and directed by Sudip E.S. The film stars Appani Sarath, Sreejith Ravi, Hareesh Peradi, Zinil Zainuddin, etc. in lead roles. The film has its story written by Riyas. This film was released on 23 November 2018.

The film received positive reviews and Critics Rating of 2.5/5 as reported by Times of India.

Plot

The film narrates the story of 2 friends Chandu and Saddam Hussein and the way everything changes once a Contessa comes into their lives

Cast
 Appani Sarath as Chandu
 Sreejith Ravi as "Mannu" Jayan
 Athira Patel as Jayan's daughter
 Zinil Zainuddin as Sadam
 Hareesh Peradi as Adika Ji
 Sunil Sukhada as Philip
Kichu Tellus as S.I Shahid Moopan
Rajesh Sharma as Pappan
 Anoop Krishnan as Rajan

Music
The film music were composed by Rijosh Aluva & Jafriz and background score by Gopi Sundar.

References

External links
 

2018 films
2010s Malayalam-language films
Indian drama films
2018 drama films